Benjamin Wyatt or Ben Wyatt may refer to:

Benjamin Dean Wyatt (1775–1852),  English architect
Ben Wyatt (footballer), English footballer
Ben Wyatt (politician), Australian politician
Ben Wyatt (Parks and Recreation), fictional character